The government of the Brussels-Capital Region is the political administration of the Brussels Capital Region of Belgium. An election is held every five years. The government is headed by a Minister-President (currently Rudi Vervoort), four ministers and three state secretaries.

Additionally, there is a Governor of the Brussels Capital Region, who is appointed by the cabinet and has the responsibility to enforce laws concerned with public order in the Brussels-Capital Region. The governor's powers are relatively limited.

The Brussels capital region is divided into 19 municipalities. Each municipality has its own government, responsible for the handling of local level duties, such as law enforcement and the upkeep of schools and roads within its borders. Municipal administration is also conducted by a mayor, a council, and an executive.

Parliament

The Parliament of the Brussels-Capital Region is also known as the Brussels Regional Parliament. It is the main decision-making body for the Brussels-Capital Region. Constitutionally, the parliament is made up of 72 French-speaking members and 17 Dutch-speaking members.

Current composition
Elections of the eighty-nine Brussels regional deputies take place every five years. Following the 2014 regional election, the composition of the Brussels Parliament is as follows:

A dot means: participating in the Brussels government.

Functions 
The Brussels Parliament role mainly consists in controlling the government of the Brussels-Capital Region, approving the budget and creating and passing legislation in regional matters, known as ordinances, which are legally binding. One of its first tasks after the Parliament is renewed is appointing five ministers and three regional secretaries of state, who together form the cabinet of the Brussels-Capital Region.

The 89 members of the Brussels Parliament are divided into two language groups: 72 belong to the French-speaking group and 17 members belong to the Dutch-speaking group. The members of the French-speaking group also make up the Parlement francophone bruxellois (in English: French-speaking Brussels Parliament), which was formerly known as the Assembly of the French Community Commission, while the members of the Dutch-speaking group make up the Council of the Flemish Community Commission. The Parlement francophone bruxellois and the Council of the Flemish Community Commission together form the United Assembly of the Common Community Commission. The Community Commissions are to a certain extent responsible for Community competencies within the Brussels-Capital Region.

19 of the 72 French-speaking members of the Brussels Parliament are also members of the Parliament of the French Community of Belgium. People voting for a Flemish party have to vote separately for 6 directly-elected members of the Flemish Parliament.

Due to the multiple capacities of single members, there are members of the Brussels Parliament who are at the same member of the Parliament of the French Community of Belgium and of the Belgian Senate as "community senators" for the French Community. However, there are certain restrictions in place in order to prevent one person from combining too many mandates. For instance, it is impossible to be a member of the Belgian Chamber of Representatives and of one of the Regional Parliaments at the same time.

Cabinet
The cabinet of the Brussels-Capital region comprises eight members, headed by a Minister-President. There are four ministers in the cabinet, two of which must be French-speaking and two Flemish. Of the three more junior Secretaries of State, at least one must be Flemish. The Minister-President is in practice always a francophone, so the cabinet of the Region has 5 French-speaking and 3 Dutch-speaking members.

Compositions

Composition 2019–present

Composition 2014–2019

Composition 2013–2014

Composition 2009–2013

Composition 2004–2009 
After the elections of 2004, the French-speaking parties PS, Ecolo and CDH formed a coalition with the Dutch-speaking parties Open VLD, CD&V en SP.A.

List of governments

See also 
 Flemish government
 Government of the French Community
 List of Ministers-President of the Brussels-Capital Region

References

External links 
 Brussels-Capital Region. Centre d'Informatique pour la Région Bruxelloise (Brussels Regional Informatics Center)

1989 establishments in Belgium
 
Brussels